Jean-Marie Atangana Mebara (born March 27, 1954) is a Cameroonian politician. He was the Minister of Higher Education from December 1997 to August 2002, the Minister of State and Secretary-General of the Presidency from August 2002 to September 2006, and the Minister of State for Foreign Affairs from September 2006 until he was dismissed from the government in a cabinet reshuffle on September 7, 2007.

Mebara was a member of the national committee for the coordination of President Paul Biya's re-election campaign in the October 2004 presidential election. His dismissal in September 2007 was said to have been linked to his reported desire to succeed Biya, in addition to Biya's disapproval of a communiqué issued as a retort to Western criticisms of the July 2007 parliamentary election.

Mebara has been detained since August 2008 at the central prison of Yaoundé. He is accused of an "attempt" to embezzle 31 million US dollars. The accusation is based on a reply to a letter he received from the General Manager of Aircraft Portfolio Management - an international aviation consulting firm. In that letter, Mebara accepted the offer made to him by the General Manager to try and protect government funds that GIA has misappropriated and were  illegitimately holding in their accounts to provide a presidential aircraft to the president of Cameroon. GIA was a shady company hired by Mebara's predecessor and purposely set up and controlled by Yves Michel Fotso - the ex-General Manager of Cameroon Airlines (who had a clear conflict of interest) to lease aircraft into Cameroon Airlines. GIA went bankrupt in 2004.

Contrary to public belief, Mebara was not involved in the purchase of a BBJ presidential aircraft which was consummated by his predecessor. The "Justice" in Cameroon is struggling to find any witnesses against him. Most people believe that he was arrested because he represented a potential threat to the re-election bid of the current Cameroon president. It is widely believed that President Biya is conducting a witch-hunt against all of his political opponents.

Mebara has suffered immense physiological and mental trauma since being held captive in prison on trumped-up corruption charges. He is a devout Christian and has the support of Cardinal Tumi an important person in the Cameroon Christian hierarchy.

On May 3, 2012, Mebara was acquitted by presiding judge Gilbert Schlick of the Mfoundi high court in Yaoundé of all charges of embezzling or attempting to misappropriate the BB jet funds. On Monday 7 May 2012 the examining judge went to Kondengui prison and issued "new" charges against Mebara in order to keep him in prison. The persecution of Mebara continues because he is still perceived as a threat to the systemically corrupt regime of Paul Biya.

References 

1954 births
Living people
Cameroonian politicians convicted of crimes
Higher education ministers of Cameroon
Foreign ministers of Cameroon